The Supii is a river in Ukraine, 130 km in length, a left tributary of the Dnieper. The Supii finds its source in Nizhyn Raion, Chernihiv Oblast.

Cities and towns on the Supii 
 Yahotyn

References 
 Енциклопедія українознавства. У 10-х томах. / Головний редактор Володимир Кубійович. — Париж; Нью-Йорк: Молоде життя, 1954–1989.
 Географічна енциклопедія України: в 3-х томах / Редколегія: О. М. Маринич (відпов. ред.) та ін. — К.: «Українська радянська енциклопедія» імені М. П. Бажана, 1989.

Rivers of Cherkasy Oblast
Rivers of Kyiv Oblast
Rivers of Chernihiv Oblast